Qualification for the men's tournament at the 2010 Winter Olympics.

Qualification
Twelve teams qualified for the ice hockey event. The top nine teams in the IIHF World Ranking after the 2008 Men's World Ice Hockey Championship received automatic berths into the ice hockey event. All remaining member federations could attempt to qualify for the remaining three spots in the Olympics. The four lowest entrants (32nd ranked Bulgaria, 36th ranked Spain, 37th ranked Mexico, and 41st ranked Turkey) played off for a spot in the first round.  Teams then ranked 19th through 30th (except China who declined) played in a first qualification round in November 2008, where the top three teams from the round advanced to the second qualification round. Teams ranked 10th through 18th joined the three top teams from the first qualifying round to play in a second qualification round. The top three teams from the second qualifying round advanced to the Olympic ice hockey tournament.

Qualified teams 

Notes

IIHF World Rating

Qualification tournament

Olympic preliminary qualification

Group A

All times are local (UTC+2).

Olympic pre-qualification

Group B

All times are local (UTC+2).

Group C

All times are local (UTC+1).

Group D

All times are local (UTC+1).

Final Olympic qualification

Group E

All times are local (UTC+1).

Group F

All times are local (UTC+2).

Group G

All times are local (UTC+1).

See also
IIHF World Ranking

References

External links
 Qualification results

Men's Qualification
Ice Hockey
2010 Winter Olympics - Men's Qualification
2010 Winter Olympics - Men's Qualification

nl:IJshockey op de Olympische Winterspelen 2010/kwalificatie#Kwalificatie mannen